Jamie Barnwell-Edinboro (born 26 December 1975), also known as Jamie Barnwell, is an English footballer who played in the Premier League for Coventry City and in the Football League for Swansea City, Wigan Athletic and Cambridge United. He played as a forward. He went on to play for a number of non-League football clubs, most recently for Hall Road Rangers whom he rejoined in October 2010. He now is one of the leading coaches at Bishop Burton College, mainly taking the Men's 2's Team while assisting James Earl in the Men's Academy.

References

External links

1975 births
Living people
English footballers
Association football forwards
Coventry City F.C. players
Swansea City A.F.C. players
Wigan Athletic F.C. players
Cambridge United F.C. players
Rushden & Diamonds F.C. players
Stevenage F.C. players
Doncaster Rovers F.C. players
Goole A.F.C. players
Scarborough F.C. players
Hinckley United F.C. players
Brigg Town F.C. players
North Ferriby United A.F.C. players
Denaby United F.C. players
Hall Road Rangers F.C. players
Scarborough Athletic F.C. players
Hull United A.F.C. players
Premier League players
English Football League players
National League (English football) players